Kwame Akoto-Bamfo (born 1983) is a multi-disciplinary artist, educator and activist, known for his sculptures and massive body of works dedicated to the memory, healing and Restorative Justice for people of African descent. His outdoor sculptures are dedicated to the memory of the victims of the Transatlantic slave trade, notably the installation Nkyinkim, on display at the National Memorial for Peace and Justice that opened in 2018 in Montgomery, Alabama. His other sculptures include an installation of 1,200 concrete heads representing Ghana's enslaved ancestors in Accra, the capital of Ghana. Called Faux-Reedom, it was unveiled in 2017.

Early life and education
Kwame Akoto-Bamfo grew up in Accra and the Eastern Region of Ghana, where he and his sister were raised by a single mother and grandmother. Learning a lot of traditional Ghanaian culture and values as well as African philosophy from  village life with his grandmother, he later attended schools in Ghana's capital Accra before attending Presbyterian Boys' Senior High School. 
Upon graduating, he trained at the College of Arts Kwame Nkrumah University of Science and Technology where he graduated with first-class honours and then later attained his master's degree from the same university.
He worked as a lecturer and acting Head of Graphic Design Department for four years, leaving in 2013 to pursue a career as a full-time artist and social entrepreneur.

Exhibitions
Kwame Akoto-Bamfo's first major exhibition was during the 60th Independence Day (Ghana) Celebration when he outdoored Nkyinkyim Installation sculptures of over 1,200 concrete portrait heads of people of African descent at the Kwame Nkrumah Mausoleum in an exhibition dubbed ‘Faux-Reedom’. Kwame used the strong imagery of life-size sculpted heads to question Ghana's independence and draw international attention to Ghana's neo-colonial legacies. 
Kwame's work toes a fine line between public art and activism. His works reference colonial legacies, racial justice, racial equity, healing and restorative justice.
Kwame's travelling exhibition Blank Slate Palimpsest Monument, also known as the Blank Slate Monument was unveiled in Ghana in 2019 and toured the United States, visiting notable places of historic significance to the 'African American Experience' such as Selma, Harlem and New York City's Times Square, where the monument was unveiled during the sentencing of Derek Chauvin for the murder of George Floyd. Other notable stops include Louisville Kentucky, Detroit's Motown Museum, Chicago's DuSable Museum and The King Center in Atlanta.

Nkyinkyim Installation
The Nkyinkyim Installation is an evolving installation, created to archive African history and African heritage, and has an extensive section dedicated to enslaved Africans. This globally acclaimed installation extends the impact of The National Memorial for Peace and Justice; the Nkyinkyim Installation and Legacy Museum; Nkyinkyim Installation; Dirge Across time/Melancholic lullabies.

Other activities

Public speaking
Kwame Akoto-Bamfo is regularly engaged in public speaking, research, and lectures largely due to his work as a sculptor, archiving and promoting African history and cultural heritage at Nkyinkyim Museum.

Film and television
The Art of Healing (2022 documentary, in post-production, Executive Producer and Co-writer)
Enslaved (2020 miniseries)
The Lost Ancestors

Awards
GUBA Influential artist of the Year 2019
Kuenyehia Prize for Contemporary Artist (Inaugural Winner)

References

External links

Biography
Building Restorative Justice Across the African Diaspora
Bearing witness to slavery: A sculpture’s trans-Atlantic passage from Ghana to Alabama - The Boston Globe
Kwame Akoto-Bamfo - STOA169
Artist - Blank Slate Monument
This traveling sculpture challenges the story Confederate statues tell (nbcnews.com)
EJI Releases Video on Sculpture About Enslavement
People&Places: A look into one of Ghana's biggest museums making waves internationally - Nkyinkyim (ghanaweb.com)
Ancestor Project Gh – Ancestor Project Gh
Exploration of the influences that shapes the art and activism.
David J. Maloney's part one of an interview with Kwame Koto-Bamfo on his influences in representational art dealing with restorative justice and the African diaspora
Part 2 of the interview with David J. Maloney, discussing the spiritual and contextual aspects of the Nkyinkyim Installation in Montgomery Alabama, and the touring installation of The Blank Slate Monument.

Academic talks/lectures
Mondays at Beinecke: Building Restorative Justice Across the African Diaspora with Kwame Akoto-Bamfo | Beinecke Rare Book & Manuscript Library (yale.edu)
The Year of Return & Beyond: Reclaiming African History and Ancestry through the Nkyinkyim Installation | Beinecke Rare Book & Manuscript Library (yale.edu)
KABE explains Ancestor Project at University of Ghana, Legon - YouTube

1983 births
Living people
21st-century Ghanaian sculptors
Ghanaian male artists
Male sculptors